Nancy Dell Freudenthal (née Roan, February 5, 1954) is a Senior United States district judge of the United States District Court for the District of Wyoming. She is the first female judge to serve in the District of Wyoming. Freudenthal was also the First Lady of Wyoming from January 6, 2003, to January 3, 2011 as the wife of Governor Dave Freudenthal.

Early life and education 

Born on February 5, 1954, in Cody, Wyoming, Freudenthal earned a Bachelor of Arts degree in 1976 from the University of Wyoming and a Juris Doctor in 1980 from the University of Wyoming College of Law.

Career 

From 1980 until 1989, Freudenthal worked in the office of the Wyoming governor as an attorney for intergovernmental affairs. From 1985 to 1986, she was an adjunct professor at the University of Wyoming College of Law. From 1989 to 1991, she served on the Wyoming Tax Commission, and from 1989 until 1995, she was on the board of the Wyoming Board of Equalization. Freudenthal has spent much of her legal career working on energy and environmental issues. In 1995, she took a job as an associate at the Cheyenne, Wyoming law firm of Davis & Cannon. In 1998, she became a partner and held that post until her nomination as a federal judge.

Federal judicial service 

According to the questionnaire that Freudenthal submitted to the United States Senate Committee on the Judiciary, after the election of Barack Obama, Freudenthal's husband, Wyoming Gov. Dave Freudenthal, asked her if she would be interested in serving as a federal district judge for Wyoming. Her husband subsequently—without telling her—submitted three possible nominees to the Obama administration for it to consider nominating: his wife, another attorney, Ford Bussart, and a state district court judge, Norman E. Young. "I thought about that long and hard, and the question really came down to (was) should she be penalized for having married me," Dave Freudenthal told a local newspaper. "And the conclusion I came down to is that all three of them are qualified, and fortunately, it's up to the president and not me."

In August 2009, the United States Department of Justice contacted Nancy Freudenthal about the nomination and she was interviewed by Justice Department lawyers on October 5, 2009. Obama formally submitted her nomination as his nominee to the United States District Court for the District of Wyoming on December 3, 2009. Freudenthal would fill the vacancy created in 2006 by Judge Clarence Addison Brimmer, Jr. assuming senior status.  President George W. Bush previously nominated Richard Honaker for the seat, but he never received a hearing on his nomination. The United States Senate Committee on the Judiciary held a hearing on Freudenthal's nomination on January 20, 2010. On May 5, 2010, the United States Senate confirmed Freudenthal by a 96–1 vote. She received her judicial commission on May 6, 2010. Freudenthal served as Chief Judge from July 24, 2011 to May 31, 2018. She assumed senior status on June 1, 2022.

References

External links

1954 births
Living people
21st-century American judges
21st-century American women judges
First Ladies and Gentlemen of Wyoming
Judges of the United States District Court for the District of Wyoming
People from Cody, Wyoming
United States district court judges appointed by Barack Obama
University of Wyoming College of Law alumni
University of Wyoming faculty